The 2021–22 Michigan Wolverines women's basketball team represented the University of Michigan during the 2021–22 NCAA Division I women's basketball season. The Wolverines were led by head coach Kim Barnes Arico in her tenth year, and played their home games at the Crisler Center. This season marked the program's 40th season as a member of the Big Ten Conference.

This season was highlighted by Michigan reaching their highest ranking ever in the AP Poll at No. 4. They also earned their first ever win over a top-five ranked team when they defeated No. 5 Baylor 74–68 in overtime on December 19, 2021. Naz Hillmon also became the program's all-time leading rebounder, surpassing the previous record set by Trish Andrew in 1993. They were ranked the No. 3 seed in the 2022 NCAA tournament, their highest seed ever, and advanced to the Elite Eight for the first time in program history.

Previous season
The Wolverines finished the 2020–21 season with a 16–6 record, including 9–5 in Big Ten play to finish in fourth place. They also reached No. 11 in the AP Poll, their highest rank ever, and were ranked the No. 6 seed in the 2021 NCAA tournament, their highest seed ever. The Wolverines advanced to the Sweet Sixteen for the first time in program history.

Offseason
On April 1, 2021, former assistant coach Toyelle Wilson was named the head coach at SMU.

On September 10, 2021, Kim Barnes Arico signed a contract extension through the 2025–26 season.

Roster

Schedule and results

|-
! colspan="9" style="background:#242961; color:#F7BE05;"| Exhibition

|-
! colspan="9" style="background:#242961; color:#F7BE05;"| Regular season

|-
! colspan="9" style="background:#242961; color:#F7BE05;"| Big Ten Women's Tournament

|-
! colspan="9" style="background:#242961; color:#F7BE05;"| NCAA Women's Tournament

Rankings

^Coaches did not release a Week 2 poll.

References

Michigan
Michigan
Michigan
Michigan Wolverines women's basketball seasons
Michigan